Plan for Skopje 1963 was the urban and architectural plan put forward to rebuild the city of Skopje following the 1963 Skopje earthquake. The plan was organised between 1963 and 1966 by the government of Yugoslavia and the United Nations. The rebuilding of the city attracted large international attention, this led to the involvement of a large number of high-profile architects. The UN invited Kenzo Tange and his team to participate in an international competition for the urban design of the city centre in 1965; as one of several  Yugoslav and international architecture teams. Architects that participated in the plan include Greek architect Constantinos Doxiadis and Polish architect Adolf Ciborowski. Dutch architects Van den Broek and Jaap Bakema. Luigi Piccinato (Italy) and Maurice Rotival (USA). Yugoslav participants included Aleksandar Dordevik, Slavko Brezoski, Edvard Ravnikar, Radovan Miščević and Fedor Wenzler.

The plan is unique in its architectural focus involving Metabolism, Brutalism and Architecture of Yugoslavia on a total scale, culturally relevant due to the international attention and collaboration backed by the UN and a rare example of Cold War unity between the superpowers of the 20th century.

The architectural plan has been revisited, theorised and discussed due to its impact on Brutalist architecture and art history of the 20th Century. The impact of the plan effected urban, historical and cultural direction of society.
The implementation of the reconstruction of Skopje is a historically unique instance of UN international collaboration, it is also the first examples of Japanese architects implementing metabolist theory and modern architecture methods on a metropolis scale urban project outside of Japan.

Planning 
The reconstruction plan of central Skopje was won by Tange's team in 1965. The project was significant not only because of its international influence, but also because it realised a new international model for urban reconstruction.

Earnest Weissman, a student of Le Corbusier and head of planning at UN Social Affairs consolidated and supervised the organisation of Skopje's reconstruction from the beginning.

Maurice Rotival a UN expert on Urban planning famously stated: "The world now expects that the New Skopje will become a model city, built not for the present but for the future. Any less eloquent result of the work done by the Leadership of the United Nation... will tell that a great opportunity was wasted. For the world's sake, Skopje has to be not just a city to live in but also a monument to the hope of a better world."

Tange planned for two symbolic centers based on a City Wall and City Gate, symbolic in nature, providing a living and transit hub respectively.

Outcomes 
The reconstruction led to the realisation of a number of modernist buildings:
 Johann Heinrich Pestalozzi Elementary School [1967-1969] funded by Switzerland and CIAM luminary Alfred Roth
 Museum of Contemporary Art [1969-1970] funded by Poland and designed by Jerzy Mokrzyński, Eugeniusz Wierzbicki and Wacław Kłyszewski.
 Military Hospital [1969-1971] by Josip Osoynik and Slobodan Nikolić, architects of Military Medical Academy in Serbia
 University Campus [1970-1974] by Slovenian Marko Mušič
 Cultural Centre [1968-unfinished] by Biro 71
 Macedonian Academy of Sciences and Arts by Boris Čipan
 City Commercial Centre [1981-1983] by Živko Popovski learned from Dutch architects Van den Broek and Jaap Bakema
 Post office, a brutalist masterpiece by Janko Konstantinov
 Goce Delčev Student Dormatory by Giorgi Konstantinovski
 City Archives, Skopje by Giorgi Konstantinovski
 State Hydro-meteorological Institute [1972-1975] by Krsto Todorovski

Maintenance and support for these buildings waned after the fall of Yugoslavia. At the start of the 21st century all of the architectural progress encapsulated by these buildings was reversed by the Skopje 2014 re-reconstruction.

References

External links 
 Spomenik Database
 Kenzo Tange Associates

History of North Macedonia
United Nations
Architectural history
Architecture in North Macedonia
Buildings and structures in North Macedonia
Buildings and structures in Skopje